Marisa Jossa (born 1938 in Naples) is an Italian television actress. In 1959 she won the title of Miss Italia, winning the crown on 30 August 1959.

Her daughter Roberta Capua was also awarded the Miss Italia title in 1986.

References

1938 births
Living people
People from the Province of Naples
Italian beauty pageant winners